Abolfazl Razzaghpour is an Iranian footballer who plays as a defender for Tractor in the Persian Gulf Pro League.

Club career

Club career statistics

References

External links
 Abolfazl Razzaghpour at FIFA.com
 Abolfazl Razzaghpour at FFIRI.ir
 

Living people
Iranian footballers
Nassaji Mazandaran players
Paykan F.C. players
1997 births
Iran under-20 international footballers
Association football defenders
Footballers at the 2018 Asian Games
People from Qaem Shahr
Asian Games competitors for Iran
Sportspeople from Mazandaran province